Nixon Airport  is located adjacent to Nixon, Ontario, Canada in Norfolk County, half a mile south of the old Nixon Public School property.

The airport serves farmers by spraying chemicals to local fields. Private airplanes belonging to local residents are stored here with the permission of the operator.

References

Registered aerodromes in Ontario
Buildings and structures in Norfolk County, Ontario
Transport in Norfolk County, Ontario